Franz Bueb (1916 or 1919 – March 26, 1982) was a German painter.

Life and work 
Born in Schleswig-Holstein in either 1916 or 1919, Franz Bueb enrolled in a Berlin art school, but emigrated to the United States following the Nazi Party's rise to power. His seventeen years in America brought him into contact with a number of well-known people. His art became known through numerous exhibitions, murals, magazine covers, and portraits of female celebrities. Bueb worked as a photographer for Life magazine and other lifestyle periodicals. He returned to Europe in 1954, settling in Paris, from where he made trips to Italy, Spain, England, and Norway. In 1959, he traveled to Austria and decided to move to Grillenberg, in Lower Austria. There he built a cottage from the remains of a log cabin he found in a nearby pond. Though he traveled frequently, Bueb featured his home and the surrounding area in his later work. He died in Vienna in 1982.

Exhibitions 

 2016: Franz Bueb – Jackie Kennedys liebster Maler, Krupp Stadt Museum, Berndorf

Catalogue 

 Eleonore Rodler: Franz Bueb – RETROspektive, Kral, Berndorf, 2014

References

External links
 Homepage Franz Bueb
 A short film essay on Franz in the Austrian Television serial Jolly Joker.

1910s births
1982 deaths
Artists from Schleswig-Holstein
20th-century German painters
20th-century German male artists
German expatriates in the United States
German emigrants to Austria